Historic Meridian Park Neighborhood  is situated north of downtown Indianapolis, and located within the larger Mapleton Fall Creek Neighborhood. While the neighborhood is fairly small, it was listed on the National Register of Historic Places in 2009.

The neighborhood began to be developed around the turn of the 20th century.  It not only has a significant collection of American Craftsman or Arts & Crafts Style homes, but is also notable as one of Indianapolis's first suburbs.

References

External links

Historic districts on the National Register of Historic Places in Indiana
Colonial Revival architecture in Indiana
Tudor Revival architecture in Indiana
Bungalow architecture in Indiana
Neighborhoods in Indianapolis
National Register of Historic Places in Indianapolis